Frank Gurnee Millard (March 1, 1892 – November 12, 1976) was an American politician and football player.



Early life and education
Millard was born in Corunna, Michigan, in 1892, the son of Frank A. Millard and Emma (Gurnee) Millard.  He attended the public schools in Corunna. He subsequently attended the University of Michigan, receiving his bachelor's degree in 1914 and a law degree in 1916.  While attending Michigan, Millard played guard for the Michigan Wolverines football team from 1912-1915.

Career

After receiving his law degree, Millard became an attorney in Flint, Michigan.  During World War I, he served as an artillery lieutenant in the U.S. Army in France.  In 1921, he helped organize the Michigan National Guard.  He was active in Republican Party politics and served as the chairman of the Genesse County Republican Committee from 1922-1924 and in 1940. He was a member of the Republican State Central Committee from 1948-1950.

Michigan Attorney General

In 1950, Millard was elected as Michigan Attorney General.  He served in that position from January 1951 through December 1954.  In November 1954, he lost his re-election bid to Thomas M. Kavanagh. He was the last Republican to hold the office of Attorney General in Michigan until Mike Cox was narrowly elected to the office in 2002.

General Counsel of the Army

In March 1955, he was appointed by President Dwight Eisenhower as the General Counsel of the U.S. Army.  In December 1956, he was hospitalized at the University of Michigan Hospital where he underwent surgery to remove a portion of one lung.  He served as the Army's General Counsel through February 1961.

Millard was married to Dorothy E. McCorkell on November 8, 1930. He died on November 12, 1976 at age of 84.

References

1892 births
1976 deaths
Michigan Wolverines football players
General Counsels of the United States Army
University of Michigan Law School alumni
People from Corunna, Michigan
Michigan Attorneys General
Michigan Republicans
20th-century American politicians
20th-century American lawyers